The Ballina branch line is a  long railway line operated by Iarnród Éireann in County Mayo, in Ireland. The branch runs from Manulla Junction on the Dublin Heuston to Westport railway line, to the town of Ballina via .

The service mainly consists of a shuttle service along the branch, connecting with Dublin-Westport services at Manulla Junction. Branch trains are worked by 2800 class Commuter railcars. There are also several freight services carrying timber or containers from the branch which run to Waterford. These are generally worked by  071 and 201 class locomotives.

The line was opened on 19 May 1873 and was originally operated by the Midland Great Western Railway.  From 1925 it became part of Great Southern Railways.  The section from Ballina to the sea at Killala closed on 1 July 1934.  From 1945 the line passed to the nationalised CIÉ then to its successor Iarnród Éireann.

References

Sources
 

Railway lines in Ireland